Ladmirault is a surname. Notable people with the surname include:

 Paul Ladmirault (1877–1944), French composer and music critic
 Paul de Ladmirault (1808–1898), French general

See also
 Lamirault

French-language surnames